Steinhauer (German for stonemason) is a surname. Notable people with the surname include:

 Ernst Steinhauer (1925–2005), West German sprint canoer
 Gustav Steinhauer (c. 1870–1930), German spy
 Henry Bird Steinhauer (1804–1885), Canadian Methodist clergyman
 Johann Steinhauer (1705–1779), Latvian entrepreneur, social reformer and landowner
 Neal Steinhauer (born 1944), United States shotputter
 Olen Steinhauer (born 1972), United States novelist
 Orlondo Steinauer (born 1973), former Canadian football safety
 Ralph Steinhauer (1905–1987), Canadian politician
 Sherri Steinhauer (born 1962), United States golfer
 Tomer Steinhauer (born 1966), Israeli basketball coach and former player

See also
 Steinhauer, Edmonton, residential neighborhood in Canada

German-language surnames